The 1966 Espirito Santo Trophy took place 20–23 October at Mexico City Country Club in Mexico City, Mexico. It was the second women's golf World Amateur Team Championship for the Espirito Santo Trophy. The tournament was a 72-hole stroke play team event with 19 three-woman teams. The best two scores for each round counted towards the team total.

The United States won the Trophy, beating Canada by nine strokes. Canada took the silver medal while defending champions France, a further eight strokes behind, took the bronze.

Teams 
19 teams contested the event. Each team had three players.

Results 

Sources:

Individual leaders 
There was no official recognition for the lowest individual scores.

References

External link
World Amateur Team Championships on International Golf Federation website

Espirito Santo Trophy
Golf tournaments in Mexico
Espirito Santo Trophy
Espirito Santo Trophy
Espirito Santo Trophy